Miguel Rio Branco (born 11 December 1946) is a Brazilian photographer, painter, and filmmaker (director and cinematographer). His work has focused on Brazil and included photojournalism, and social and political criticism.

Rio Branco is an Associate Member of Magnum Photos. His photographs are included in the collections of the Museum of Modern Art and Metropolitan Museum of Art in  New York.

Life and work
Rio Branco was born in Las Palmas, Gran Canaria, in the Canary Islands. His parents were diplomats and he spent his childhood in Portugal, Switzerland, Brazil and the United States. In 1976 he moved to New York City, where he earned a BA, and took a one-month vocational course at the New York Institute of Photography. In 1978, he moved to Rio de Janeiro and studied at the Industrial Design College.

He has been an Associate Member of Magnum Photos since 1980. He lives and works in Rio de Janeiro.

Rio Branco's Silent Book (1997) is included in Parr and Badger's The Photobook: A History, Volume II.

Publications by Rio Branco
Dulce Sudor Amargo. Mexico: Fondo de Cultura Economica, 1985. .
Nakta. Brazil: Multiprint Grafica, 1996.
Silent Book. São Paulo: Cosac & Naify. 1997. .
Second edition, 2012.
Miguel Rio Branco: An Aperture Monograph. New York: Aperture, 1998. .
Pele do Tempo. Brazil: Centro de Arte Hélio Oiticica, 1999.
Entre Los Ojos. Barcelona: Fundación "la Caixa", 1999. . Text in Spanish and English.
Miguel Río Branco habla con Teresa Siza. Conversaciones con Fotografos. La Fábrica, 2002. . In Spanish.
Entre os Olhos, o Deserto. Brazil: Cosac & Naify, 2002. .
Gritos Surdos. Portugal: Centro Portugues de Fotografia, 2002.
Plaisir la Douleur. France: Textuel, 2005. .
Out Of Nowhere. Luste, 2009. .
Você Está Feliz. Cosac & Naify, 2012. .
Mechanics of Women. La Fábrica, 2017. .
New York Sketches. Xavier Barral, 2018. .

Short films by Rio Branco
Trio Elétrico
Caveirinhas
Nada Levarei Quando Morrer = those who owe me will be charged in hell – 20 minute documentary with still and moving images
Entre os Olhos o Deserto
Gritos Surdos

Collections
Museum of Modern Art, New York: 37 works (as of May 2019)
Metropolitan Museum of Art, New York: 25 works (as of May 2019)

References

External links
 (requires Flash)

Magnum photographers
Brazilian painters
Brazilian photographers
Living people
1946 births
Brazilian film directors